Stéphane N'Zue Mba (born 22 June 1979) is a Gabonese light middleweight boxer. Mba represented Gabon at the 2000 Summer Olympics, where he lost his only match to Cuban Juan Hernández Sierra.

References

1979 births
Living people
Gabonese male boxers
Olympic boxers of Gabon
Boxers at the 2000 Summer Olympics
Light-middleweight boxers
African Games medalists in boxing
21st-century Gabonese people
African Games bronze medalists for Gabon
Competitors at the 1999 All-Africa Games